Rupert Henry St. John Barker Moon (born 1 February 1968) is a former Wales international rugby union player. He played club rugby for Welsh clubs Abertillery and Neath but is most associated with Llanelli, who he captained during their unprecedented triple success season of 1992 when they won the League and Cup, and beat then Rugby World Cup Champions Australia. He played international rugby for Wales at scrum half, winning 24 caps.

Family life 
Moon was born in Birmingham, England to Henry and Audrey Moon. His elder brother, Richard  Moon, played rugby for Walsall, Abertillery, Harlequins, England A and the Barbarians at scrum half. His elder sister, Estelle Moon, played rugby at Scrum Half for Wasps Ladies. Rupert is married, with two children.

Education, post-rugby career and charity work 
Rupert Moon studied at Sandwell College and later the University of Glamorgan where he achieved a degree in Public Administration.

Alongside playing rugby, Moon ventured into radio-broadcasting work, hosting his own show 'Over the Moon' on Dragon FM. Other media work followed and following his rugby career he became a radio and television presenter on HTV and BBC Wales, presenting amongst other programmes - X-Ray, Tellyphonin', Moon and the Stars, Homeland, and Radio Wales' Rush Hour.

Moon became Head of Group Commercial & Business Development in 2003 for the Welsh Rugby Union and the Millennium Stadium, when the Group recorded record turnover and record profits. He was one of three people who staged the Tsunami Relief Concert at the Millennium Stadium in January 2005.

He joined Protectagroup, an insurance broker, in 2007, as Group Marketing Director. He returned in June 2009 to the Scarlets as Commercial Director.

From 2012 to 2016 he was General Manager of the North Wales Rugby Development Region, setting up a new regional rugby team in North Wales, where he oversaw the staffing, operational and strategic management of joint WRU and Conwy Council initiatives.

Moon currently works as Director of Corporate and Social Responsibility and Marketing at WRW Construction.

He is Patron of charities Tenovus Cancer Care and the Welsh Rugby Charitable Trust and is active in fundraising activities for a number of charities.

Rugby career
Moon played rugby for Abertillery RFC, Neath RFC, and, most famously, from 1990, Llanelli RFC, his 'spiritual home'. He played at scrum half. Moon went on to captain Llanelli, a team he played 272 games for over 12 years, scoring 77 tries.

During the 1992 season, Moon captained Llanelli during their unprecedented triple success season, where they won the League and Cup, and beat then Rugby World Cup Champions Australia. Moon earned 24 caps for the Wales national rugby team at Scrum Half, making his debut in 1993 in the then Five Nations Championship. Moon retired from international rugby in 2001.

Notes

1968 births
Living people
Abertillery RFC players
Alumni of the University of Glamorgan
English rugby union players
Llanelli RFC players
Neath RFC players
People educated at Queen Mary's Grammar School
Rugby union players from Birmingham, West Midlands
Wales international rugby union players
Rugby union scrum-halves